The Washington Library Association (WLA) is a professional organization for librarians and library workers in the U.S. state of Washington. It is headquartered in Seattle and has 1,504 individual members and 49 institution members .

WLA was founded by the Washington State Library at a meeting in Tacoma on March 27, 1905. Meetings were held annually until 1909 when the first WLA was merged with the newly formed Pacific Northwest Library Association. It was briefly organized as the Puget Sound Library Association and then re-established in its current form with its first meeting on June 30, 1932. The WLA has published an academic journal called Alki since 1983.

WLA has four divisions: Academic, Public, School, and Special. WLA also has eleven interest-based sections, Collection Development & Technical Services (CATS), Children's and Young Adult Services (CAYAS), College Libraries Across Washington State (CLAWS), Intellectual Freedom Section (IFS), Leadership is For Everyone (LIFE), Library & Information Student Section (LISS), Serving Adults in Libraries (SAIL), Social Responsibilities (SRRT), WA Library Employees (WALE), WA Library Trainers (WALT), and WA Library  Friends, Foundations, Trustees, and Advocates (WLFFTA).

References

External links
 Washington Library Association website
 Pacific Northwest Library Association

Library associations in the United States
Organizations based in Washington (state)